Russel Tank is located between Williams and Tusayan in North Central Arizona.

Fish species

 Rainbow Trout
 Yellow Perch

References

External links
Arizona Boating Locations Facilities Map
Arizona Fishing Locations Map

Reservoirs in Coconino County, Arizona
Reservoirs in Arizona